The German Armed Forces Deployment Medal is a decoration of the Bundeswehr, the armed forces of the Federal Republic of Germany. The decoration is awarded for military service in a designated military campaign. It is awarded to all German soldiers regardless of rank. It is also the only type of German campaign medal awarded, the only difference is the campaign bar worn on the medal and ribbon.

Grades
The decoration has three grades. The grade is awarded without consideration of rank but by the time a served in the designated campaign area:
 
 Bronze for 30 days in theatre.
 Silver is for 360 days in theatre.
 Gold for 690 days in theatre.

In November 2010, Karl-Theodor zu Guttenberg, the German minister of defense, introduced a special grade: the Gefechtsmedaille der Bundeswehr (Combat Action Medal of the Bundeswehr). The medal has been awarded for 56 different operations or missions since its establishment.

Design 
The medal is round, on its center is displayed the German eagle surrounded by a wreath of laurel leaves, the reverse side is plain.  The combat version differs slightly from standard grades in that the medal is always golden with a black and red rim and a black eagle.

The ribbon has two black stripes on the edges with two red stripes beside it and two golden stripes on the in side with another bold red stripe in the middle, the ribbon bar has the campaign bar attached to it.

Campaign Bars 
The medal is issued with a clasp denoting foreign the operation recognized by the medal.  Like the medal the clasp is either, bronze, silver or gold:

See also

Awards and decorations of the German Armed Forces
Combat Action Medal of the Bundeswehr

References

Military awards and decorations of Germany (Bundeswehr)
German campaign medals
Awards established in 1996
1996 establishments in Germany